The fifth season of the American television series Whose Line Is It Anyway? premiered on ABC on September 9, 2002, and concluded on September 5, 2003.

Cast

Recurring 
 Greg Proops (10 episodes)
 Brad Sherwood (nine episodes)
 Kathy Greenwood (five episodes)
 Chip Esten (five episodes)
 Kathy Griffin (four episodes)
 Jeff Davis (two episodes)
 Whoopi Goldberg (one episode)

Episodes 

"Winner(s)" of each episode as chosen by host Drew Carey are highlighted in italics. The winner would take his or her seat and call a sketch for Drew to perform (often with the help of the rest).

References

External links
Whose Line Is It Anyway? (U.S.) (a Titles & Air Dates Guide)
Mark's guide to Whose Line is it Anyway? - Episode Guide

Whose Line Is It Anyway?
2002 American television seasons
2003 American television seasons